The 2017 Advantage Cars Prague Open by Zenova was a professional tennis tournament played on outdoor clay courts. It was the 24th (men) and third (women) editions of the tournament and was part of the 2017 ATP Challenger Tour and the 13th edition of the women's tournament, this year as part of 2017 ITF Women's Circuit. It took place in Prague, Czech Republic, on 24–30 July 2017.

Men's singles main draw entrants

Seeds 

 1 Rankings as of 17 July 2017.

Other entrants 
The following players received a wildcard into the singles main draw:
  Dominik Kellovský
  Vít Kopřiva
  Marek Podlešák
  Robin Staněk

The following player received entry into the singles main draw as a special exempt:
  Marko Tepavac

The following player received entry into the singles main draw as an alternate:
  Marek Jaloviec

The following players received entry from the qualifying draw:
  Maxime Chazal
  Juan Ignacio Galarza
  Lenny Hampel
  Jurij Rodionov

The following player received entry as a lucky loser:
  Roman Safiullin

Women's singles main draw entrants

Seeds 

 1 Rankings as of 17 July 2017.

Other entrants 
The following players received a wildcard into the singles main draw:
  Miriam Kolodziejová
  Jesika Malečková
  Karolína Muchová
  Dayana Yastremska

The following player received entry by a protected ranking:
  Mihaela Buzărnescu

The following player received entry by a junior exempt:
  Anastasia Potapova

The following players received entry from the qualifying draw:
  Ulrikke Eikeri
  Anhelina Kalinina
  Camilla Rosatello
  Olga Sáez Larra

The following players received entry as lucky losers:
  Raluca Georgiana Șerban
  Chantal Škamlová

Champions

Men's singles

 Andrej Martin def.  Yannick Maden 7–6(7–3), 6–3.

Women's singles

 Markéta Vondroušová def.  Karolína Muchová, 7–5, 6–1

Men's doubles
 
 Jan Šátral /  Tristan-Samuel Weissborn def.  Gero Kretschmer /  Andreas Mies 6–3, 5–7, [10–3].

Women's doubles
 
 Anastasia Potapova /  Dayana Yastremska def.  Mihaela Buzărnescu /  Alona Fomina, 6–2, 6–2

External links 
 2017 Advantage Cars Prague Open at ITFtennis.com
 Official website

2017 ITF Women's Circuit
Advantage Cars Prague Open
2017
2017 in Czech tennis